"Ozark Mountain Jubilee" is a song written by Scott Anders and Roger Murrah and recorded by American country music group The Oak Ridge Boys. It was released in October 1983 as the first single from the album Deliver. The song reached #5 on the Billboard Hot Country Singles & Tracks chart. Jan Howard also covered the song on her 1985 self-titled album.

Chart performance

References

1983 songs
The Oak Ridge Boys songs
Jan Howard songs
Songs written by Roger Murrah
Song recordings produced by Ron Chancey
MCA Records singles
1983 singles